Teodor Anders Peterson (born 1 May 1988 in Umeå) is a Swedish former cross-country skier that had sprint as his best discipline.

Career
He debuted in the World Cup on 7 March 2009 in Lahti in the 2008–09 season.

Peterson made his breakthrough in the 2011–12 season. He won the first sprint race of the season, on 25 November 2011 in Ruka, Finland. The weekend after, in Düsseldorf, he won the team sprint together with Jesper Modin, representing Sweden.

Peterson won his first individual World Cup victory on 2 February 2012 in Moscow.

Peterson also won the overall sprint world cup 2011/2012.

Peterson competed for Sweden in 2010 Winter Olympics in Vancouver. He finished in 11th place in the individual sprint and 15th place in the team sprint together with Marcus Hellner.
Peterson also competed for Sweden in the World Championships in Oslo 2011 there, he went out in the quarterfinals and finished in 16th place.

He won silver in the sprint and a bronze in the sprint relay at the 2014 Winter Olympics in Sochi.

Cross-country skiing results
All results are sourced from the International Ski Federation (FIS).

Olympic Games
 2 medals – (1 silver, 1 bronze)

World Championships

Season titles
 1 title – (1 sprint)

Season standings

Individual podiums
 4 victories – (2 , 2 )
 12 podiums – (6 , 6 )

Team podiums
 1 victory – (1 )
 4 podiums – (4 )

References

External links

 

1988 births
Swedish male cross-country skiers
Cross-country skiers at the 2010 Winter Olympics
Cross-country skiers at the 2014 Winter Olympics
Cross-country skiers at the 2018 Winter Olympics
Olympic cross-country skiers of Sweden
Medalists at the 2014 Winter Olympics
Olympic medalists in cross-country skiing
Olympic bronze medalists for Sweden
Olympic silver medalists for Sweden
IFK Umeå skiers
Sportspeople from Umeå
Living people